Olesya Viktorovna Romasenko (born 12 January 1990) is a Russian sprint canoeist.

She participated at the 2018 ICF Canoe Sprint World Championships.

References

1990 births
Russian female canoeists
Living people
ICF Canoe Sprint World Championships medalists in Canadian
Sportspeople from Krasnodar
Canoeists at the 2019 European Games
European Games medalists in canoeing
European Games bronze medalists for Russia
Canoeists at the 2020 Summer Olympics
Olympic canoeists of Russia